The Windsor River is a tributary of the Skeena River located in the Skeena-Queen Charlotte Regional District, British Columbia, in the southwestern part of Canada.

The river flows north about  through mainly coniferous forest.  The river's drainage basin is virtually uninhabited, with less than 2 inhabitants per square kilometre. Inland climate is prevailing in the area. The local average annual temperature is 0 °C. The warmest month is August, when the average temperature is 11 °C and the coldest is December, with -8 °C.

See also
List of British Columbia rivers
List of ships in British Columbia

References 

Article contains translated text from Windsor River on Swedish Wikipedia from 25 March 2017.

Rivers of the North Coast of British Columbia
Skeena Country
Range 5 Coast Land District